Sistan may refer to:

Sistan, a historical region
Sistan and Baluchestan Province